Tomostele musaecola is a species of small air-breathing land snail, terrestrial pulmonate gastropod mollusk in the family Streptaxidae.

Distribution 
The indigenous distribution of Tomostele musaecola includes:
 West Africa

This West African species has been widely reported from the Neotropics as Luntia insignis (E. A. Smith, 1898).

The non-indigenous distribution of Tomostele musaecola includes:
 Australia
 Melanesia and Polynesia
 throughout the Caribbean Basin. It was reported as Streptostele musaecola from various Caribbean localities by Hausdorf & Medina Bermúdez (2003).
 Dominica - introduced. First reported in 2009.

Ecology 
This species is molluscivorous (it eats other mollusks), and its effect on the native malacofauna of Dominica is as yet undocumented.

References
This article incorporates CC-BY-3.0 text from the reference.

 Holyoak, D. T.; Holyoak, G. A.; Lima, R. F. D.; Panisi, M.; Sinclair, F. (2020). A checklist of the land Mollusca (Gastropoda) of the islands of São Tomé and Príncipe, with new records and descriptions of new taxa. Iberus: Revista de la Sociedad Española de Malacología, (Iberus).38(2): 219-319

External links
 Morelet, A. (1860). Descriptions de nouvelles espèces de l'Afrique occidentale, rapportées par M. le capitaine Vignon. Journal de conchyliologie. 8 (2): 189-191.
 Smith, E. A. (1898). On some land shells from Trinidad. Journal of Conchology. 9: 27–29
 Espinosa, J. A. & Robinson, D. G. (2021). Annotated checklist of the terrestrial mollusks (Mollusca: Gastropoda) from Hispaniola Island. Novitates Caribaea. 17: 71–146

Streptaxidae
Gastropods described in 1860